Ergene  is a planned district and second level municipality in Tekirdağ Province, Turkey. According to Law act no 6360, all Turkish provinces with a population more than 750 000, will be a metropolitan municipality and the districts within the metropolitan municipalities  will be second level municipalities. The law also creates new districts within the provinces in addition to present districts. These changes will be effective by the local elections in 2014.

Thus after 2014 a part of the Çorlu district will be issued from Çorlu and will be declared a district named Ergene.   (Ergene refers to a river with the same name which is a tributary of Meriç)

Rural area
There were 3 towns and 10 villages in the rural area of the district. Now their official status became  "neighborhood of Ergene".

References

Districts of Tekirdağ Province
Tekirdağ